Irene Oguiza Martínez (born 5 January 2000) is a Spanish footballer who plays as a midfielder for Athletic Club.

Club career
Oguiza started her career in Ezkurdi's academy. On 19 January 2020, she made her debut for Athletic Club, coming on as a substitute for Andrea Sierra against Madrid CFF. Her first start for the Athletic Club first team was against Deportivo on 2 February, during which she suffered an anterior cruciate ligament injury to her knee. She had an operation on 5 March and would not play again until 8 November, against Collerense, in which she scored a goal. For the remainder of that season, Oguiza established herself as a first team regular under manager Iraia Iturregi and it was announced that she would be formally promoted to Athletic's first team for the 2021–22 Primera División season.

References

External links
 
 
 
 

2000 births
Living people
Women's association football midfielders
Spanish women's footballers
People from Durango, Biscay
Sportspeople from Biscay
Footballers from the Basque Country (autonomous community)
Athletic Club Femenino players
Primera División (women) players
Segunda Federación (women) players
Athletic Club Femenino B players